Orenaia andereggialis is a species of moth in the family Crambidae. It is found in France, Italy, Switzerland and Austria.

References

Moths described in 1851
Evergestinae
Moths of Europe